Murawski (feminine: Murawska; plural: Murawscy) is a Polish surname. Notable people with the surname include:

 Alfred Murawski, pen name of Alfred Szklarski (1912–1992), Polish author
 Bob Murawski (born 1964), American film editor
 Maciej Murawski (born 1974), Polish footballer
 Rafał Murawski (born 1981), Polish footballer
 Radosław Murawski (born 1994), Polish footballer
 Scott Murawski (born 1956), American musician
 Shaun Murawski, Scottish photographer

See also
 
 
 

Polish-language surnames